David Muir Chalmers (22 July 1891 – 24 April 1920) was a Scottish professional footballer who played as a centre forward in the Scottish League for Kilmarnock, Third Lanark and Raith Rovers. He also played in the Football League for Grimsby Town.

Personal life 
Chalmers served as a private in the Football Battalion during the First World War.

Career statistics

References

Scottish footballers
English Football League players
Association football forwards
Kilmarnock F.C. players
Arthurlie F.C. players
1891 births
People from Leven, Fife
British Army personnel of World War I
Middlesex Regiment soldiers
Third Lanark A.C. players
Raith Rovers F.C. players
East Fife F.C. players
York City F.C. (1908) players
1920 deaths
Grimsby Town F.C. players
Gillingham F.C. players
Southern Football League players
Brentford F.C. wartime guest players
Scottish Football League players
Footballers from Fife